Salmo chilo is a salmonid fish, a relative of trout first described as a distinct species in 2012 from the Akdere Stream, a tributary of the Ceyhan River in Turkey.  It is described as having a bulbous forehead, a blunt snout, and a mouth located on the bottom of the head with fleshy lips.

References 

Chilo
Fish described in 2012